The Men's 400 metres T12 event at the 2012 Summer Paralympics took place at the London Olympic Stadium from 2 to 6 September.

Records
Prior to the competition, the existing World and Paralympic records were as follows:

Results

Round 1
Competed 2 September 2012 from 19:00. Qual. rule: winner of each heat (Q) plus the 4 fastest other times (q) qualified.

Heat 1

Heat 2

Heat 3

Heat 4

Semifinals
Competed 4 September 2012 from 11:40. Qual. rule: winner of each heat (Q) plus the two fastest other times (q) qualified.

Heat 1

Heat 2

Final
Competed 6 September 2012 at 19:00.

 
Q = qualified by place. q = qualified by time. WR = World Record. PB = Personal Best.

References

Athletics at the 2012 Summer Paralympics